Wayne Cooper (born 9 June 1978, in Bradford) is an English former professional snooker player. He first qualified for the main tour in 2001, and was a professional until Summer 2002. Cooper regained his place on the 2008/09 pro tour by finishing top of the EASB Pro Ticket Tour rankings. He won three matches during that season: in the Northern Ireland Trophy, in the Welsh Open and in the World Snooker Championship.

Cooper played in the 2020 World Seniors Championship as a replacement for Tony Drago, defeating Gary Filtness 4-2 before losing 1–4 to Michael Judge in the quarter-finals. He failed to qualify for the main 2021 World Seniors Championship after finishing second in his qualifying group to Peter Lines.

References

External links
 Profile on the Global Snooker Centre
 Profile at Pro Snooker Blog

1978 births
Living people
English snooker players
Sportspeople from Bradford